A.C. ChievoVerona played its fourth consecutive season in Serie A, and nearly equaled 7th place from the 2002-03 Serie A season.
After a quite good start, the club finished 15th in Serie A, escaping relegation for just one point.

Competitions

Serie A

References

A.C. ChievoVerona seasons
Italian football clubs 2004–05 season